Mehal Kalan Assembly constituency is one of the 117 Legislative Assembly constituencies of Punjab state in India.
It is part of Barnala district and is reserved for candidates belonging to the Scheduled Castes. Kulwant Singh Pandori of the Aam Aadmi Party is the current MLA of this constituency.

Members of the Legislative Assembly

Election results

2022

2017

2012

See also
 List of constituencies of the Punjab Legislative Assembly
 Barnala district

References

External links
 

Assembly constituencies of Punjab, India
Barnala district